Lars Bjerring Larsen (born 30 November 1981) is a Danish football trainer and former football player, who currently works as goalkeeping coach for OB. He had to retire from his active career as a goalkeeper in 2010 due to aninjury.

Coaching career

Køge BK
In February 2011, Bjerring signed a contract with Køge Boldklub as a goalkeeping coach for the youth teams of the club.

HB Køge
Bjerring signed a full time contract with HB Køge in the summer 2011 as a goalkeeper coach. In March 2012, Bjerring signed a three month contract with HB Køge as a back-up goalkeeper, because of injuries in the HB Køge squad. He didn't play any matches in the period.

FC Nordsjælland
FC Nordsjælland signed Bjerring from HB Køge in June 2015 for the new season.

OB
Bjerring replaced Lars Høgh at OB in March 2016.

References

External links 
 Lars Bjerring Profile on hbkoge.dk

1981 births
Living people
Danish men's footballers
Herfølge Boldklub players
HB Køge players
Association football defenders